Prunus crassifolia is species of Prunus native to the Democratic Republic of the Congo. Some authorities consider it a synonym of Prunus africana.

References

crassifolia
Endemic flora of the Democratic Republic of the Congo
Trees of the Democratic Republic of the Congo
Plants described in 1965